Thomas Thornton (25 January 1831 – 23 November 1897) was an Irish-born American farmer and politician who served as a member of the Wisconsin State Assembly.

Biography
Thornton was born in County Mayo, Ireland. He settled in Cato, Wisconsin in 1851 and worked as a farmer.

Political career
Thornton was a member of the Assembly during the 1864, 1877 and 1878 sessions. Other positions he held include Treasurer and member of the school board of Cato. He was a member of the Democratic Party of Wisconsin.

References

1831 births
1897 deaths
Politicians from County Mayo
Irish emigrants to the United States (before 1923)
People from Cato, Wisconsin
Democratic Party members of the Wisconsin State Assembly
City and town treasurers in the United States
School board members in Wisconsin
Farmers from Wisconsin
19th-century American politicians